The name Hurlock can mean:

Hurlock, Maryland, a town in the United States
Madeline Hurlock (1899-1989), a silent film actress
Terry Hurlock (born 1958), a former professional footballer
A type of Darkspawn creature in the Dragon Age media franchise